The Romantic Anonymous Fellowship was founded by the Stuckist painter Odysseus Yakoumakis on September 2004, as the first, and currently the only, Greek group of Stuckism International. It has an international membership.

History
Odysseus Yakoumakis discovered Stuckism in July, 2004, while surfing the net, and saw in it an antidote to what he deems "the ailments of the contemporary Greek 'artscape'". He contacted Charles Thomson, the London founder of Stuckism, and a few days later founded The Romantic Anonymous Fellowship. He conceived this as a "Greek version of Stuckism, an antidote to contemporary Greek art's provincialism, sectarianism and servile importation of post-modernism". He developed the concept of "Romantic Stuckism", that is of "Stuckism with a good injection of Eleatic and Platonic philosophy, oriented rather towards encouraging each artist to pursue his/her genuinely personal artistic vision rather, than towards pointless polemics against the reactionary official art-establishment". He published the first two Romantic Stuckist theoretical texts on the Fellowship's website.

At that stage he was the Fellowship's only fellow and, as far as he knew, the only artist in Greece aware of the Stuckist movement. He contacted other fine artists in Athens, but described the reactions he got as "ranging from a tepid 'academic curiosity' to a sheer lack of interest or even, occasionally, to a politely concealed hostility."  He was however contacted by artists from overseas and accepted them into the Fellowship. The first to apply was Ian J. Burkett, a painter living in London and founder of the Ealing Stuckists group. Shortly after, followed the painter and etcher Ilania Abileah from Canada, and the painter and etcher Anthe (who is of Greek descent) from the US.

Under the Cover of Romantic Anonymity
Yakoumakis determined that Stuckism should, nevertheless, be brought "in the flesh" before the eyes of the Greek fine arts community, and organised the first Stuckist event in Greece, titled Under the Cover of Romantic Anonymity, announced for May 14 of 2010 at the Ash-In-Art Gallery, Athens, Greece.

In parallel with the show, the new book by Odysseus Yakoumakis will be featured, titled "Leaflets from the Wilderness (a case study about the artscape in nouveau-Greece and many other lands)" (Ash-In-Art Publications).

Stuckist artists taking part include: 
Ilania Abileah
ANTHE
Ian J. Burkett
Odysseus Yakoumakis
Guest artists participating are:
Ray Wilkins
Lefteris Yakoumakis
Vasilis Selimas
Nickos Delijannis

Footnotes

See also

Stuckism
Remodernism
Odysseus Yakoumakis

References
Odysseus Yakoumakis, "A Romantic & Anonymous (nonetheless signed) Critique of Post Modernism" 
Odysseus Yakoumakis, "The Romantic Anonymous Manifesto"
Odysseus Yakoumakis, "The Academic Provincialism of contemporary Greek Art and its proposed Stuckist remedy"

External links
 Stuckist web site
 The Romantic Anonymous Fellowship official site
 Odysseus Yakoumakis official site
 Ian J. Burkett's official site
 Ilania Abileah's official site
 ANTHE's official site

Greek contemporary art
International artist groups and collectives
Art movements
Stuckism